Direction Reaction Creation is an anthology issued in 1997 by the British band The Jam. It includes 117 tracks over 5 discs, including all of the songs from their singles (although, where applicable, the A sides are present in their album versions only) and six studio albums. The box set reached #8 in the UK Album Chart.

Track listing

CD 1
"In the City"
"Takin' My Love"
"Art School"
"I've Changed My Address"
"Slow Down"
"I Got By in Time"
"Away from the Numbers"
"Batman Theme"
"Sounds from the Street"
"Non-Stop Dancing"
"Time for Truth"
"Bricks and Mortar"
"All Around the World"
"Carnaby Street"
"The Modern World" (Album Version)
"London Traffic"
"Standards"
"Life from a Window"
"The Combine"
"Don't Tell Them You're Sane"
"In the Street Today"
"London Girl"
"I Need You (For Someone)"
"Here Comes the Weekend"
"Tonight at Noon"
"In the Midnight Hour"

CD 2
"News of the World"
"Aunties and Uncles (Impulsive Youths)"
"Innocent Man"
"David Watts" (Album Version)
"'A' Bomb in Wardour Street" (Album Version)
"Down in the Tube Station at Midnight" (Album Version)
"So Sad About Us"
"The Night"
"All Mod Cons"
"To Be Someone (Didn't We Have A Nice Time)"
"Mr. Clean"
"English Rose"
"In the Crowd"
"Billy Hunt"
"It's Too Bad"
"Fly"
"The Place I Love"
"Strange Town"
"The Butterfly Collector"
"When You're Young"
"Smithers-Jones" (Single Version)
"The Eton Rifles" (Album Version)
"See-Saw"

CD 3
"Girl on the Phone"
"Thick as Thieves"
"Private Hell"
"Little Boy Soldiers"
"Wasteland"
"Burning Sky"
"Smithers-Jones" (Setting Sons Version)
"Saturday's Kids"
"Heat Wave"
"Going Underground"
"The Dreams of Children"
"Start!" (Album Version)
"Liza Radley"
"Pretty Green"
"Monday"
"But I'm Different Now"
"Set the House Ablaze"
"That's Entertainment"
"Dream Time"
"Man in the Corner Shop"
"Music for the Last Couple"
"Boy About Town"
"Scrape Away"

CD 4
"Funeral Pyre"
"Disguises"
"Absolute Beginners"
"Tales from the Riverbank"
"Town Called Malice"
"Precious" (12" Version)
"Happy Together"
"Ghosts"
"Just Who Is the 5 O'Clock Hero?"
"Trans-Global Express"
"Running on the Spot"
"Circus"
"The Planner's Dream Goes Wrong"
"Carnation"
"The Gift"
"The Great Depression"
"The Bitterest Pill (I Ever Had to Swallow)"
"Pity Poor Alfie/Fever"
"Beat Surrender"
"Shopping"
"Move on Up"
"Stoned Out of My Mind"
"War"

CD 5
"In the City" (8-track Polydor Band Demo)
"Time for Truth" (8-track Polydor Band Demo)
"Sounds from the Street" (8-track Polydor Band Demo)
"So Sad About Us" (Band Demo)
"Worlds Apart" (Demo)
"Billy Hunt" (Alternate Version)
"It's Too Bad" (Band Demo)
"To Be Someone" (Band Demo)
"David Watts" (Band Demo)
"Best of Both Worlds" (Band Demo)
"That's Entertainment" (Band Demo)
"Rain" (Demo)
"Dream Time" (Demo) 
"Dead End Street" (Demo)
"Stand By Me" (Demo)
"Every Little Bit Hurts" (Demo)
"Tales from the Riverbank" (Alternate Version)
"Walking in Heaven's Sunshine" (Demo)
"Precious" (Demo)
"Pity Poor Alfie" (Swing Version)
"The Bitterest Pill (I Ever Had to Swallow)" (First Version)
"A Solid Bond in Your Heart" (Band Demo)

Personnel
 Afrodiziak – background vocals
 Martin Drover – trumpet
 Claudia Fontaine – background vocals
 Russell Henderson – steel drums
 Steve Nichol – trumpet, Hammond organ
 Keith Thomas – saxophone, soprano sax
 Luke Tunney – trumpet
 Caron Wheeler – background vocals
 Peter Wilson – piano, drums, keyboards, Hammond organ, producer, string arrangements, remixing
 Tracie Young – background vocals

Additional personnel

 Neil Allen – liner notes, essay
 Vic Coppersmith-Heaven – producer
 Paul Cox – photography
 Johnny Devlin – liner notes, essay
 Ian Dickson – photography
 Jill Furmanovsky – photography
 Pat Gilbert – liner notes, essay
 Frank Griffin – photography
 Simon Halfon – art direction, design
 Paolo Hewitt – liner notes, foreword
 The Jam – producer
 Mike Laye – photography
 Gered Mankowitz – photography
 Dennis Munday – producer, compilation, remixing, research
 Steve Musters – remixing
 Carlos Olms – photography
 Denis O'Regan – photography
Chris Parry – producer
 John Reed – liner notes, essay
 Pennie Smith – photography
 Vic Smith – producer
 Tony Taverner – producer
 Virginia Turbett – photography
 Laurens Van Houten – photography
 Roger Wake – digital remastering
 Arnold Williams – photography

References

The Jam albums
1997 compilation albums
Polydor Records compilation albums